Kristofer Siimar (born 3 February 1998) is an Estonian tennis player.

Siimar has a career high ATP doubles ranking of 1276 achieved on 13 August 2018.

Siimar represents Estonia at the Davis Cup where he has a W/L record of 0–1. His twin brother Mattias Siimar is also a tennis player.

Davis Cup

Participations: (0–1)

   indicates the outcome of the Davis Cup match followed by the score, date, place of event, the zonal classification and its phase, and the court surface.

References

External links
 
 
 

1998 births
Living people
Estonian male tennis players
Sportspeople from Tallinn
21st-century Estonian people